Agelasta basimaculata is a species of beetle in the family Cerambycidae. It was described by Heller in 1934. It is known from the Philippines.

References

basimaculata
Beetles described in 1934